The Dave Andreychuk Mountain Arena & Skating Centre is a recreation complex in Hamilton, Ontario, Canada. It includes a figure skating rink and a 2,500-seat ice hockey arena. Originally it was built in 1966, known as the Mountain Arena until it was renovated in 2005 and renamed in honour of Dave Andreychuk, a former ice hockey player from Hamilton.

Tenants
On two brief occasions, the arena was home to Hamilton teams in the Ontario Hockey League, the Fincups (1977–1978) and the Steelhawks (1984–1985). From 1973 to 2015 it was home to Hamilton Red Wings of the Ontario Junior Hockey League and is the home of the Hamilton Jr. B Bengals lacrosse.

Currently the senior Hamilton Steelhawks and Jr. B Hamilton Kilty B's play out of the arena.

External links
The OHL Arena & Travel Guide - Mountain Arena

Indoor arenas in Ontario
Indoor ice hockey venues in Canada
Ontario Hockey League arenas
Sports venues in Hamilton, Ontario